Funny or Die Presents: America's Next Weatherman is an American reality competition hosted by Matt Oberg on TBS. Contestants compete in various challenges based on weather forecasting, in an attempt to win $100,000, an agent, and an appearance forecasting the weather on CNN's New Day. It is produced by Funny or Die and premiered on August 8, 2015.

Episodes

References

External links
 

2010s American reality television series
2015 American television series debuts
2015 American television series endings
TBS (American TV channel) original programming
2010s American comedy game shows
Television series by Funny or Die